SM UB-109 was a German Type UB III submarine or U-boat in the German Imperial Navy during World War I. She was commissioned into the German Imperial Navy on 31 December 1917 as SM UB-109.

UB-109 was sunk by mine in the English Channel on 29 August 1918 and underwater scanning of the area covered by the Dover Barrage shows her wreck broken in half.

Construction

She was built by Blohm & Voss of Hamburg and following just under a year of construction, launched at Hamburg on 7 July 1917. UB-109 was commissioned later the same year under the command of Oblt.z.S. Kurt Ramien. Like all Type UB III submarines, UB-109 carried 10 torpedoes and was armed with a  deck gun. UB-109 had a displacement of  while surfaced and  when submerged. Her engines enabled her to travel at  when surfaced and  when submerged.

Summary of raiding history

References

Notes

Citations

Bibliography

External links 
 Scott, G (2015) 'UB-109 off Folkestone, Kent: Archaeological Report', Wessex Archaeology
 Historic England project to research First World War submarines

German Type UB III submarines
World War I submarines of Germany
U-boats commissioned in 1918
1917 ships
Ships built in Hamburg
Maritime incidents in 1918
U-boats sunk in 1918
U-boats sunk by mines
World War I shipwrecks in the English Channel
Protected Wrecks of the United Kingdom